Terry Tyrome Godwin (born October 23, 1996) is an American football wide receiver who a member of the Hamilton Tiger-Cats of the Canadian Football League (CFL). He played college football at Georgia and was drafted by the Carolina Panthers in the seventh round of the 2019 NFL Draft. He has also been a member of the Jacksonville Jaguars and Tennessee Titans.

Professional career

Carolina Panthers
Godwin was drafted by the Carolina Panthers in the seventh round (237th overall) of the 2019 NFL Draft. He was waived during final roster cuts on August 31, 2019.

Jacksonville Jaguars
On September 10, 2019, Godwin was signed to the Jacksonville Jaguars practice squad. His practice squad contract with the team expired after the season on January 6, 2020.

Godwin was re-signed by the Jaguars on March 26, 2020. He was waived on September 5, 2020, and re-signed to the practice squad the next day. He was placed on the practice squad/COVID-19 list by the team on October 17, 2020, and was activated back to the practice squad on October 22. He was elevated to the active roster on November 14 and November 21 for the team's weeks 10 and 11 games against the Green Bay Packers and Pittsburgh Steelers, and reverted to the practice squad after each game. He was placed back on the practice squad/COVID-19 list on December 18, 2020, and restored to the practice squad again on December 30. He was promoted to the active roster on January 2, 2021. On June 3, 2021, Godwin was placed on injured reserve. 

On March 15, 2022, Godwin signed a one-year contract extension with the Jaguars.  He was released on May 16, 2022.

Tennessee Titans
Godwin was signed by the Tennessee Titans on July 28, 2022. He was waived on August 22, 2022.

Hamilton Tiger-Cats 
On September 12, 2022, Godwin signed with the Hamilton Tiger-Cats of the Canadian Football League (CFL).

References

External links
Georgia Bulldogs bio

1996 births
Living people
People from Hogansville, Georgia
Players of American football from Georgia (U.S. state)
American football wide receivers
Georgia Bulldogs football players
Carolina Panthers players
Jacksonville Jaguars players
Tennessee Titans players